The Potamogetonaceae, commonly referred to as the pondweed family, is an aquatic family of monocotyledonous flowering plants. The roughly 110 known species are divided over six genera. The largest genus in the family by far is Potamogeton, which contains about 100 species.

The family has a subcosmopolitan distribution, and is considered to be one of the most important angiosperm groups in the aquatic environment because of its use as food and habitat for aquatic animals.

Taxonomy

The Potamogetonaceae are currently placed in the early diverging monocot order Alismatales by the Angiosperm Phylogeny Group. Their concept of the family includes the plants sometimes treated in the separate family Zannichelliaceae, but excludes the genus Ruppia. So circumscribed, the family currently consists of six genera: Althenia, Groenlandia, Lepilaena, Potamogeton, Stuckenia, and Zannichellia, totalling about 120 species of perennial aquatic plants.

Marine grasses families: Zosteraceae, Cymodoceaceae, Ruppiaceae and Posidoniaceae. Related families: Potamogetonaceae, Zannichelliaceae (not consistently).

Characteristics

The plants are all aquatic perennial herbs, often with creeping rhizomes and leafy branches. Their leaf blades can be either floating or submerged, and their stems are often joined. No stomata are present on the leaves. The flowers are tetramerous: the floral formula (sepals; petals; stamens; carpels) is [4;0;4;4]. The flowers have no petals. The fruit consists of one to four drupelets or achenes.

Genera
Althenia
Groenlandia
Lepilaena
Potamogeton
Pseudalthenia
Stuckenia
Zannichellia

References

External links
Angiosperm Phylogeny Website
Potamogetonaceae at the DELTA Online Families of Flowering Plants
Potamogetonaceae at the Germplasm Resources Information Network
Potamogetonaceae at the Online Flora of North America
Zannichelliaceae at the Online Flora of North America
Potamogetonaceae at the NCBI Taxonomy Browser

 
Alismatales families
Aquatic plants